Aadijatmiko Christina Finarsih (born 8 February 1972) is a retired badminton player from Indonesia who specialized in women's doubles.

Career 
Finarsih won a number of significant international titles during the 1990s, most of them with regular partner Lili Tampi. These included the Dutch Open (1993), the World Badminton Grand Prix (1993), the Indonesia Open (1993, 1994), the Chinese Taipei Open (1994), and the Badminton World Cup (1994). She also won the 1996 Asian Championships with another fellow countrywomen Eliza Nathanael. Finarsih and Tampi were silver medalists at the 1995 IBF World Championships in Lausanne, Switzerland. They were eliminated in the quarterfinals of the 1992 Olympics in Barcelona, Spain, and in the round of sixteen at the 1996 Olympics in Atlanta, Georgia, USA.

The two greatest highlights of Finarsih's badminton career, however, were not victories in any tournament for individual players. Rather, they were a pair of unexpected victories with Tampi in the final round of Uber Cup (the women's international team championship) in 1994 and 1996 which were critical in helping to lift Indonesia to victories over favored and long-dominant China.

Achievements

World Championships 
Women's doubles

World Cup 
Women's doubles

Asian Championships 
Women's doubles

Mixed doubles

Asian Cup 
Women's doubles

Southeast Asian Games 
Women's doubles

World Junior Championships 
The Bimantara World Junior Championships was an international invitation badminton tournament for junior players. It was held in Jakarta, Indonesia from 1987 to 1991.

Girls' doubles

IBF World Grand Prix 
The World Badminton Grand Prix has been sanctioned by the International Badminton Federation from 1983 to 2006.

Women's doubles

Mixed doubles

 IBF Grand Prix tournament
 IBF Grand Prix Finals tournament

References

External links 
 
 
 FINARSIH at bwfworldchampionships.com
 FINARSIH at olympics.bwfbadminton.com

1972 births
Living people
Sportspeople from Special Region of Yogyakarta
Indonesian female badminton players
Badminton players at the 1992 Summer Olympics
Badminton players at the 1996 Summer Olympics
Olympic badminton players of Indonesia
Badminton players at the 1994 Asian Games
Asian Games silver medalists for Indonesia
Asian Games medalists in badminton
Medalists at the 1994 Asian Games
Competitors at the 1991 Southeast Asian Games
Competitors at the 1993 Southeast Asian Games
Competitors at the 1995 Southeast Asian Games
Southeast Asian Games gold medalists for Indonesia
Southeast Asian Games silver medalists for Indonesia
Southeast Asian Games medalists in badminton